Immaculate Conception is a 1992 film written and directed by British director Jamil Dehlavi with James Wilby, Melissa Leo and Shabana Azmi playing the lead roles.

The film won special jury prize at the Festival of British Cinema, Dinard.

Plot
Hannah, Jewish-American daughter of a US senator, and her British lover Alistair, working as an environmentalist in Pakistan, desperate for a child, visit the eunuch shrine of Gulab Shah which has a reputation for curing infertility. While Alistair is embroiled in a brief love affair with a Pakistani photographer, Hannah conceives and decides to convert to Islam, coaxing Alistair to do the same, causing a conflict with her family. Meanwhile, the eunuchs from the shrine develop an interest in Hannah's baby, leading to tension from the clash of cultures and religious beliefs.

Cast
James Wilby as Alistair 
Melissa Leo as Hannah 
Shabana Azmi as Samira 
Zia Mohyeddin as Shehzada 
James Cossins as Godfrey 
Shreeram Lagoo as Dadaji
Ronny Jhutti as Kamal 
Tim Choate as David Schwartz 
Bill Bailey as American Consul 
Badi Uzzaman as Dadaji's Retainer

Critical response
Kim Newman reviewing the film in Empire Online wrote, "despite trying to shoehorn oodles of secondary themes into the brew, the psychological tug-of-war between Islam and Judaism, some nasty imperialist behaviour, and the downbeat ending make this well worth a look, if for no other reason than Western audiences rarely get a chance to see anything vaguely Asian."

See also
Jamil Dehlavi

References

External links

British drama films
Films set in Pakistan
1992 drama films
1992 films
1990s English-language films
1990s British films